This is a comprehensive listing of releases, collaborations, remixes and productions documenting the solo work of the British electronic musician Kieran Hebden. Alongside his role as a member of Fridge, Hebden has established himself as a solo artist under the moniker Four Tet, and has performed as part of the duo Kieran Hebden and Steve Reid.

To date, Four Tet has released eleven studio albums, six live albums, five compilation albums, three DJ mix albums, three EPs, twenty-two singles and one DVD on Output Recordings, Domino Records, Text Records, Azuli Records and Studio !K7. Kieran Hebden and Steve Reid have released four studio albums on Domino Records.

Hebden's debut solo release was the single "Double Density", released in 1997 under the name 4T Recordings.

Four Tet

Studio albums
 Dialogue (Output Recordings, May 1999)
 Pause (Domino Records, 28 May 2001)
 Rounds (Domino Records, 5 May 2003); #60 UK
 Everything Ecstatic (Domino Records, 23 May 2005); #59 UK
 There Is Love in You (Domino Records, 25 January 2010); #35 UK
 Pink (Text Records, 20 August 2012); #74 UK
 Beautiful Rewind (Text Records, 14 October 2013); #108 UK
 Morning/Evening (Text Records, 21 June 2015) #48 UK
 New Energy (Text Records, 29 September 2017); #48 UK
 Sixteen Oceans (Text Records, March 2020); #34 UK
 Parallel (Text Records, December 2020)

Live albums
 Live in Copenhagen 30th March 2004 (Domino Records, 10 April 2004)
 Live at Funkhaus Berlin, 10th May 2018 (Text Records, 22 August 2018) (Under moniker "4TLR" on Spotify)
 Live in Tokyo, 1st December 2013 (Text Records, 5 September 2018) (Under moniker "4TLR" on Spotify)
 Live at Hultsfred Festival, 18th June 2004 (Text Records, 12 September 2018) (Under moniker "4TLR" on Spotify)
 Live at LPR New York, 17th February 2010 (Text Records, 26 September 2018) (Under moniker "4TLR" on Spotify)
 Live at Alexandra Palace London, 8th and 9th May 2019 (Text Records, 8 May 2019)

Compilation albums
 Remixes (Domino Records, 25 September 2006)
 Angel Echoes Remixes (Domino Records, 2010)
 Twitter 100k (self-released, 2013)
 Randoms (self-released, 20 June 2016)

Mix albums
 Late Night Tales: Four Tet (Azuli Records, 4 October 2004) (DJ mix album in the Late Night Tales series)
 DJ Mix (Domino Records) (Rounds-era promo album)
 DJ-Kicks: Four Tet (Studio !K7, 26 June 2006) (DJ mix album in the DJ-Kicks series)
 Much Love to the Plastic People (December 2009) (There Is Love in You-era promo album)
 FabricLive.59 (Fabric Recordings, 2011) (DJ mix album in the FabricLive series)

Extended plays
 Paws (Domino Records, 3 September 2001)
 Everything Ecstatic Part 2 (Domino Records, 7 November 2005)
 Ringer (Domino Records, 21 April 2008)

Singles
 "Double Density" (Output Recordings, 1997) (as 4T Recordings)
 "Falken's Maze" (Go! Beat, 1998) (as Joshua Falken)
 "Thirtysixtwentyfive" (Output Recordings, 27 July 1998)
 "Misnomer" (Output Recordings, 21 December 1998)
 "Glasshead" / "Calamine" (double A-side) (Output Recordings, July 1999); #197 UK
 "No More Mosquitoes" (Domino Records, 2 July 2001)
 "I'm on Fire" (Domino Records, 1 May 2002)
 "She Moves She" (Domino Records, 31 March 2003); #180 UK
 "As Serious as Your Life" (Domino Records, 20 October 2003); #119 UK
 "My Angel Rocks Back and Forth" (Domino Records, 3 May 2004); #156 UK
 "Castles Made of Sand" (Azuli Records, 4 October 2004) (b/w "Don'ts" by David Shrigley)
 "Smile Around the Face" (Domino Records, 11 April 2005); #189 UK
 "Sun Drums and Soil" (Domino Records, 11 July 2005); #197 UK
 "A Joy" (Domino Records, 24 October 2005); #96 UK
 "Pockets" (Studio !K7, 12 June 2006)
 "Love Cry" (Domino Records, 2 November 2009)
 "Locked" / "Pyramid" (Text Records, 12 September 2011)
 "Jupiters" / "Ocoras" (Text Records, 28 May 2012)
 "128 Harps" (Text Records, 2 July 2012)
 "Lion" / "Peace for Earth" (Text Records, 15 October 2012)
 "Kool FM" (Text, 2013)
 "Two Thousand and Seventeen" (Text Records, 2017)
 "Planet" (Text Records, 2017)
 "SW9 9SL" (Text Records, 2017)
 "Scientists" (Text Records, 2017)
 "Teenage Birdsong" (Text Records, 2019)
 "Dreamer" (Text Records, 2019)
 "Anna Painting" (Text Records, 2019)
 "Baby" (Text Records, 2020)
 "4T Recordings" (Text Records, 2020)
 "Mango Feedback/Watersynth" (Text Records, 10 August 2022)

Downloads
 "Back2thestart" (Free download, 5 August 2015)

Collaborations

 "Crawl, End Crawl" (Columbia, 2008) (collaboration with David Arnold for Quantum of Solace)
 "Moth" / "Wolf Cub" (Text, 1 May 2009) (collaboration with Burial)
 "Ego" / "Mirror" (Text Records, 16 March 2011) (collaboration with Burial and Thom Yorke)
 "Nova" (Text Records, 19 March 2012) (collaboration with Burial)
 "Roseland" / "Metropolis" (Text Records, 2013) (collaboration with Rocketnumbernine)
 "Makondi" (Brownswood, 2014) (collaboration with Emanative)
 "Glassbeadgames (8 Hours At Fabric Dub)" (Ninja Tune, 2014) (collaboration with Martyn)
 "Killer" / "Nasty" (Text, 2014) (collaboration with Terror Danjah)
 "Mothers" / "Dark" (Text, 2016) (collaboration with Designer.)
 "Flip Side" / "Disparate" (Text, 2016) (collaboration with Champion.)
"Her Revolution" / "His Rope" (XL, 2020) (collaboration with Burial and Thom Yorke)
"Butterflies" (Owsla / Atlantic Records, 2021) (collaboration with Skrillex and Starrah)

Split releases
 "Rivers Become Oceans" (Lo Recordings, May 1999) (split with Rothko)
 "Four Tet v Pole EP" (aka Pole v Four Tet EP) (The Leaf Label, 26 June 2000) (split with Pole)
 "Hella/Four Tet Split" (Ache Records, 30 March 2004) (Canada) (split 7-inch with Hella)
 "Nothing to See" / "Don't Let Me Go" (Soul Jazz Records, July 2010) (split 12-inch with Mala)
 "Pinnacles" / "Ye Ye" (Text Records, March 2011, split 12-inch with Daphni, TEXT009)

Video
 "Everything Ecstatic DVD" (Domino Records, 7 November 2005) (DVD featuring video clip for each tracks of the album plus Everything Ecstatic Part 2 CD)

Online mixes and podcasts
 RA.102 (Resident Advisor, 2008)
 Much Love to the Plastic People (self-released, 2009)
 Essential Mix (BBC, 2010)
 fabric podcast 34/35 (fabric, 2010)
 Return to Plastic People (FACT Mix 182) (FACT Magazine, 2010)
 Boiler Room 49 (Boiler Room, 2011)
 Beats in Space 587 (Beats in Space, 2011)
 Conference of the Birds (self-released, 2012)
 Just Jam 86 (Just Jam, 2013)
 Solid Steel Podcast 176 (Solid Steel, 2013)
 1234567890qwertyuiopasdfghjklzxcvbnm (self-released, 2014)
 Just Jam 117 (Just Jam, 2014)
 Ray-Ban x Boiler Room 004 SXSW Warehouse (Boiler Room, 2014)
 Plastic People Closing Party, London (with Floating Points) (self-released, 2015)
 Essential Mix (with Jamie xx) (BBC, 2015)
 Boiler Room, London (Boiler Room, 2015)
 Resident Advisor Pres. Ibiza 20, R1 Dance Radio (Resident Advisor, 2015)
 Dekmantel Podcast 032 (Dekmantel, 2015)
 Live at Far Away, Los Angeles, 28 October (self-released, 2016)
 Essential Mix (BBC, 2018)
 Lost Village 25th August 2018 (self-released, 2018)

Compilation appearances
 Invisible Soundtracks – Volume III (Leaf, 16/02/1998 – features "Field")
 Derailed presents: Fallout (Derailed, 30/04/1998, – features "Field")
 Classic Plant (Leaf, 08/06/1998 – features "Field")
 Fabulous Shit (Lo Recordings, 01/06/1999 – features the Four Tet/Rothko track "Rivers Become Oceans")
 Osmosis (Leaf, 03/08/1999 – features "Cload")
 Channel 1 – A Compilation of Output Recordings (Output, January 2000 – features "Calamine (radio version)" as well as "Anglepoised" by Fridge)
 Constant Friction – Collaborations 2 (Lo Recordings, June 2000 – features the Four Tet/Rothko track "Rivers Become Oceans")
 Hamlet – Music from the Motion Picture (Ryco, 26/01/2001 – features "Calamine")
 Leaf Compilation (Skintone/Leaf, 12/03/2001 – mix album by Susumu Yokota, features "Cload" and "Heim (Four Tet remix)" by Pole)
 The Wire Tapper 07 (The Wire, May 2001 – free to subscribers of The Wire magazine with May 2001 issue, features "Glue of the World")
 Ondas de Resistencia – RCB 94.4FM (Domino Records, June 2001 – Spanish promo CD of Domino acts, features "No More Mosquitoes")
 PIAS at Pukkelpop (Play It Again Sam, August 2001 – promo CD for PIAS acts playing at the Pukkelpop festival in Belgium, features "No More Mosquitoes")
 Chilled Ibiza II (Warner, 27/08/2001 – features "Parks")
 The Big Chill – Glisten (Big Chill Recordings, 24/09/2001 – features "Parks")
 Solid Steel presents DJ Food & DK (Ninja Tune, 08/10/2001 – features "Glasshead")
 Disco Pogo for Punks in Pumps Vol. 6 (Domino Records, April 2003 – free CD with April 2003 issue of Jockey Slut magazine, features "She Moves She")
 Modern Painters (Domino Records, June 2003 – free CD with summer 2003 issue of Modern Painters magazine, features "She Moves She")
 Born Three (Domino Records, July 2003 – promotional item released by R. Newbold and Rough Trade Shops in Japan, features "Slow Jam")
 La Route du Rock – La Compilation 2003 (Domino Records, August 2003 – features "She Moves She")
 Worlds of Possibility (Domino Records, October 2003 – features "She Moves She")
 Declaration of Independence – The Sound of Domino Records (Domino Records, January 2004 – NME compilation, features "As Serious as Your Life")
 Exclaim 12th Anniversary Cross-Canada Concert Series (Sonic Unyon, April 2004 – Exclaim Magazine compilation CD, features "And They Look Broken Hearted" and "Glue of the World")
 Chilled Ibiza Gold (Warner, 31/05/2004 – features "Parks")
 Bit Street (Sonar Music, June 2004 – DJ mix album by DJ2B2 to promote the 2004 Sónar festival in Barcelona, features "As Serious as Your Life (Jay Dee remix)")
 Spunk, Days of Future Past (Spunk Records, 25/10/2004 – features "As Serious as Your Life")
 Semper Satago (Domino Records, 05/04/2005 – features "As Serious as Your Life")
 Everything Comes & Goes (Temporary Residence, 11/04/2005 – compilation of covers of Black Sabbath songs, features "Iron Man")
 Galactic Soul (BBE, 07/11/2005 – features "Field")
 Check the Water (The Leaf Label, 7 November 2005 – features "Field")
 They'll Have to Catch Us First (Domino Records, 17/04/2006 – features "A Joy")
 Get Lost (Crosstown Rebel Music, 06/06/2006 – DJ mix album by Damien Lazarus & Matthew Styles, features "A Joy (Battles remix)")
 Colours Are Brighter (Rough Trade Records, 16 October 2006 – charity album featuring "Go Go Ninja Dinosaur" with Princess Watermelon)
 We Are the Works in Progress (Asawa Kuru, 2012 – features "Moma")
 Think & Change (Nonplus, 2013 – features "For These Times")
 BOATS (Transgressive North, 2014 – features "Gillie Amma, I Love You")
 Eat Your Own Ears Recordings EP 1 (Eat Your Own Ears Recordings - features "Scythe Master")

Kieran Hebden and Steve Reid

Albums
 The Exchange Session Vol. 1 (Domino Records, 27 February 2006)
 The Exchange Session Vol. 2 (Domino Records, 22 May 2006)
 Tongues (Domino Records, 19 March 2007)
 NYC (Domino Records, 4 November 2008)

KH

Singles
 "The Track I've Been Playing That People Keep Asking About and That Joy Used in His RA Mix and Daphni Played On Boiler Room" (Text Records, 4 February 2013)
 "Question" (Text Records, 2017)
 "Only Human" (Text Records, 2019)
 "Looking At Your Pager" (Text Records, 20 May 2022)
 "Looking At Your Pager" (CLIPZ Remix) (Text Records, 26 August 2022)
 "Looking At Your Pager" (Solomun Remix) (Text Records, 2 September 2022)

Percussions

Albums
 2011 until 2014 (Text Records, 2015)

Singles
 "Percussions One/Percussions Two" (Text Records, 2011)
 "Bird Songs/Rabbit Songs" (Text Records, 2012)
 "ASCII Bot/Blatant Water Cannon" (Text Records, 2014)
 "KHLHI" (Text Records, 2014)
 "Digital Arpeggios" (Text Records, 2015)

00110100 01010100

Albums 
 0181 (Text Records, 15 January 2013) (Released on bandcamp under 74 65 78 74 which is 'text' in ASCII)
 871 (Text Records, December 2020)

⣎⡇ꉺლ༽இ•̛)ྀ◞ ༎ຶ ༽ৣৢ؞ৢ؞ؖ ꉺლ

EPs/Singles 
The titles of this album and its tracks are composed from sequences of characters from the extended Unicode character set:

 ・✧(๑ඕัළ*.。 * ̈°。 (✧*:･ſ░▓░, 2017)
 .·.·* ́ ̈.·*:・✧๑ඕั ҉ (⊀❍|◗щ (*ㅇ△ Φ, 2017)
 )✧⃛* (*¸.·* ´¨・*・ .°。·´¨´ *´¨゜. ´¨゜. .· ・*. *¨°。. ・*。¸.·* ´.·*¨.· ・, 2017)
  ̡ ҉ ҉.·๑ඕั ҉ ̸ ̡ ҉ ҉.·๑ඕั ҉ ̸ ̡ ҉ ҉.·๑ඕั ҉ ̸ ̡ ҉ ҉.·๑ඕั ҉ ̸ ̡ ҉ ҉.·๑ඕั ҉ ̸ ̡ ҉ ҉.·๑ඕั ҉ ̸ ̡ ҉ ҉.·๑ඕั ҉ ( ҉ ҉, 2018)
 ʅ͡͡͡͡͡͡͡͡͡͡͡(ƟӨ)ʃ͡͡͡͡͡͡͡͡͡͡ ꐑ(ཀ ඊູ ఠీੂ೧ູ࿃ूੂ✧ළඕั࿃ूੂ࿃ूੂੂ࿃ूੂළඕั✧ı̴̴̡ ̡̡͡|̲̲̲͡ ̲̲̲͡͡π̲̲͡͡ ɵੂ≢࿃ूੂ೧ູఠీੂ ඊູཀ ꐑ(ʅ͡͡͡͡͡͡͡͡͡͡͡(ƟӨ)ʃ͡͡͡͡͡͡͡͡͡͡ (༈೧ູ≢)ꐑʅ(Ɵↂↂ. l̡̡̡ ̡͌l̡*̡̡ ̴̡ı̴̴̡ ̡̡͡| ̲̲͡ π̲̲͡͡.̸̸̨̨ ఠీੂ)༼ू༈೧ູ࿃ूੂ༽(ଳծູ l̡̡̡ ̡͌l̡*̡̡ ̴̡ı̴̴̡ ̡̡͡| ̲̲͡ π̲̲͡͡ ɵੂ≢)_̴ı ̡͌ ̲|̡̡̡ ̡ ̴̡ı̴̡̡ ̡͌l̡̡̡ꐑ*:･✧(ཽ๑ඕัළඕั)ꐑʅ(Ɵↂ๑)✧*:･ı̴̴̡ ̡̡͡| ̲̲͡ π̲̲͡͡.̸̸̨̨ ఠీੂ)༼ू༈೧ູʅ(ƟӨ)ʃ ꐑ(ཀ ඊູ ఠీੂ)༼ू༈೧ູ࿃ूੂ༽(ଳծູɵੂ≢ↂ. l̡̡̡ ̡͌l̡*̡̡ ̴̡., 2019)
 ooo ̟̞̝̜̙̘̗̖҉̵̴̨̧̢̡̼̻̺̹̳̲̱̰̯̮̭̬̫̪̩̦̥̤̣̠҈͈͇͉͍͎͓͔͕͖͙͚͜͢͢͢͢͢͢͢͢͢͢͢͢͢͢ͅ oʅ͡͡͡͡͡͡͡͡͡͡͡( ؞ৢ؞ؙؖ⁽⁾˜ัิีึื์๎้็๋๊⦁0 ̟̞̝̜̙̘̗̖҉̵̴̨̧̢̡̼̻̺̹̳̲̱̰̯̮̭̬̫̪̩̦̥̤̣̠҈͈͇͉͍͎͓͔͕͖͙͚͜͢͢͢͢͢͢͢͢͢͢͢͢͢͢ͅ ఠీੂ೧ູ࿃ूੂ ( ؞ৢ؞ؙؖ ̟̞̝̜̙̘̗̖҉̵̴̨̧̢̡̼̻̺̹̳̲̱̰̯̮̭̬̫̪̩̦̥̤̣̠҈͈͇͉͍͎͓͔͕͖͙͚͜͢͢͢͢͢͢͢͢͢͢͢͢͢͢ͅ ̟̞̝̜̙̘̗̖҉̵̴̨̧̢̡̼̻̺̹̳̲̱̰̯̮̭̬̫̪̩̦̥̤̣̠҈͈͇͉͍͎͓͔͕͖͙͚͜͢͢͢͢͢͢͢͢͢͢͢͢͢͢ͅ, 2020)
vȯ)) ̷̨ʅ(۝ʅ(Ɵʅ():::()̵̳̗̊(Ɵʅ()vȯ)) ̷̨ʅ (2020vȯ)) ̷̨()vȯ)) ̷̨)(Ɵʅ()(Ɵʅ())

Remixes
 Urban Species - "Blanket" (Talkin' Loud, 1 April 1999)
 Rothko - "Rivers Become Oceans" (Lo Recordings, 1999)
 Aphex Twin - "Untitled (Cliffs)" (Warp Records, 12 October 1999)
 Pole - "Heim" 12-inch (The Leaf Label, 26 June 2000)
 The Cinematic Orchestra - "Ode to the Big Sea" (Ninja Tune, 1 August 1999)
 David Holmes - "69 Police" (Go! Beat Records, 7 August 2000)
 Regular Fries - "Brainticket" (Mixmag, 1 November 2000)
 Slag Boom Van Loom - "Sutedja" (Planet Mu, 29 May 2001)
 His Name Is Alive - "One Year" (4AD Records, 9 July 2001)
 Two Banks of Four - "Street Lullaby" (Sirkus Recordings, 6 August 2001)
 The Dining Rooms - "Cosi Ti Amo" (Milano 2000, 27 September 2001)
 Kings of Convenience - "Weight of my Words" (Source Records, 30 October 2001)
 James Yorkston - "The Lang Toun" (Domino Records, 25 March 2002)
 The Notwist - "This Room" (City Slang Records, April 2002) in collaboration with Manitoba
 Badly Drawn Boy - "Something to Talk About" (XL Recordings, 10 June 2002)
 Doves - "M62 Song" (Heavenly Records, 15 July 2002)
 Blue States - "Metro Sound" (XL Recordings, 1 August 2002)
 Bussetti - "Softly" (Realise Records, July 2003)
 Super Furry Animals - "The Piccolo Snare" (Placid Casual, 21 July 2003)
 Beth Orton - "Daybreaker" (Heavenly Records, September 2003)
 Beth Orton - "Carmella" (Heavenly Records, September 2003)
 Bonobo - "Pick Up" (Ninja Tune, 20 October 2003)
 Radiohead - "Skttrbrain" (Parlophone, 17 November 2003)
 Sia - "Breathe Me" (Go! Beat Records, February 2004)
 Jef Gilson - "Fables of Gutenburg" (Isma's, 2003)
 Boom Bip - "Third Stream"  (Lex Records, 31 May 2004)
 Lars Horntveth - "Tics" (Smalltown Supersound, 14 June 2004)
 Hot Chip - "The Ass Attack" (Moshi Moshi Records, 4 October 2004)
 Pedro - "Fear & Resilience" (Melodisc, 18 October 2004)
 Black Sabbath - "Iron Man" (from the album Everything Comes & Goes, Temporary Residence Limited, 11 April 2005)
 Madvillain - Four Tet Remixes ("Meat Grinder", "Accordion", "Money Folder", "Great Day", "Rhinestone Cowboy", "Shadows of Tomorrow (Instrumental)") (Stones Throw Records, May 2005)
 Galactic Soul - "Cosmic Soul Street Classics" (BBE, 2 May 2005)
 Bloc Party - "So Here We Are" (V2 Records, Japan,  3 May 2005) Bonus track from the Japanese version of the Silent Alarm album
 Juana Molina - "Salvese Quien Pueda" (Domino Records, 16 May 2005)
 Jamie Lidell - "The City"  (Warp Records, 2006)
 Adem - "Launch Yourself" (Domino Records, 2006)
 Cyne - "Automaton" (City Centre Offices, 2005)
 Coldplay - "Fix You" (2005, unreleased)
 The Memory Band  - "Come Write me Down" (Peacefrog Records, 2006)
 Archie Bronson Outfit - "Dead Funny" (Domino Records, 2006)
 The Longcut - "Vitamin C" (Sony Records, 2006)
 Aluminium - "Forever is for Her" (XL Recordings, 2006)
 Steve Reich - "Drumming" (Nonsuch 2006)
 Arab Strap - "The First Big Weekend "(Chemikal Underground, 2006)
 Anne Wirz - "Guerrière" (Heavenly Sweetness, 2006)
 Explosions in the Sky - "Catastrophe and the Cure" (Temporary Residence, 2007)
 Matthew Dear - "Deserter" (Ghostly International, 2007)
 Battles - "Tonto" (Warp, 2007)
 Caribou - "Melody Day" (Colette, 2007)
 The Drift - "Gardening, Not Architecture" (Temporary Residence Limited, 2007)
 Nathan Fake - "You Are Here" (Border Community, 2007)
 Doug Hammond - '"Dope of Power Suite" (Heavenly Sweetness, 2007)
 Thom Yorke - "Atoms For Peace" (XL Recordings, 11 February 2008)
 Born Ruffians - "I Need a Life" (Warp Records, 2008)
 Andrew Bird - "Imitosis" (Chrysalis, 2008)
 Joe Goddard - "Apple Bobbing" (Greco-Roman, 2009)
 Anti-Pop Consortium - "Volcano" (Big Dada Recordings, 2009)
 Manic Street Preachers - "Pretension/Repulsion" (Columbia, 2009)
 Guv'ner - "Baby's Way Cruel" (Merge, 2009)
 The Acorn - "Restoration" (Bella Union, 2010)
 Babe, Terror - "Summertime Our League" (Phantasy, 2010)
 Lindstrøm & Christabelle - "Lovesick" (Smalltown Supersound, 2010)
 Rocketnumbernine - "Matthew and Toby" (Text, 2010)
 The xx - "VCR" (XL, 2010)
 Bob Holroyd - "African Drug" (Phonica, 2010)
 Pantha du Prince - "Stick To My Side" (Rough Trade, 2010)
 Tegan and Sara - "Alligator" (Sire, 2010)
 Jon Hopkins - "Vessel" (Double Six, 2010)
 Eluvium - "The Motion Makes Me Last" (Temporary Residence, 2010)
 Radiohead - "Separator" (Ticker Tape Ltd. 2011)
 Crazy Bald Heads - "First Born" (Text, 2011)
 Tinariwen - "Tenere Taqqim Tossam" (Rise Record Club, 2011)
 Emanative & Ahmed Abdullah - "Lions of Judah" (Brownswood Recordings, 2011)
 Neneh Cherry & The Thing - "Dream Baby Dream" (Smalltown Supersound, 2012)
 Ultraísta - "Smalltalk" (Ghostly International, 2012)
 FaltyDL - "Straight & Arrow" (Ninja Tune, 2012)
 Hot Chip - "Look At Where We Are" (Domino Records, 2012)
 To Rococo Rot - "He Loves Me" (City Slang, 2012)
 Justin Timberlake ft. Jay-Z - "Suit & Tie" (Sony Music, 2013)
 DIANA - "Perpetual Surrender" (Jagjaguwar. 2013)
 Rocketnumbernine - "Rotunda" (self-released, 2013)
 Grimes - "Skin" (self-released, 2013)
 Sia - "Chandelier" (RCA, 2014)
 Lana Del Rey - "West Coast" (Polydor, 2014)
 John Beltran - "Faux" (Text, 2014)
 Ellie Goulding - "Burn" (self-released, 2014)
 CHVRCHES - "Leave a Trace" (Virgin EMI Records, 2015)
 Eric Prydz - "Opus" (Pryda Recordings, 2015)
 Hot Chip - "Need You Now" (Domino Records, 2015) (as Percussions)
 Oneohtrix Point Never - "Sticky Drama" (Warp Records, 2016)
 Shura - "Touch" (Polydor, 2016)
 Tangents - "Jindabyne" (Temporary Residence Ltd., 2016)
 Rihanna - "Kiss It Better" (Roc Nation, 2016)
 Mura Masa & A$AP Rocky - "Love$ick" (Anchor Point, 2016)
 Todd Terje - "Jungelknugen" (Olsen, 2017)
 The xx - "A Violent Noise" (Young, 2017)
 Kaitlyn Aurelia Smith - "I Will Make Room For You" (Western Vinyl, 2017)
 Bicep - "Opal" (Ninja Tune, 2018)
 Sigrid - "Sucker Punch" (Island, 2018)
 Daniel Avery - "Quick Eternity" (Phantasy Sound, 2018)
 Headie One feat. Dave - "18HUnna" (Relentless, 2019)
 Skrillex, Boys Noize and Ty Dolla Sign - "Midnight Hour" (Owsla / Atlantic Records, 2019)
 Caribou - "Never Come Back" (City Slang, 2020)
 Tame Impala - "Is It True" (Modular Recordings, 2020)
Rozi Plain - "Conditions" (Memphis Industries, 2020) (as Kieran Hebden)
A Grape Dope - "Rainbo Locals" (AKP Recordings, 2020)

Productions
 James Yorkston and the Athletes - Just Beyond the River (Domino Records, 2004)
 Chrome Children Vol. 2, (Stones Throw Records, 2007)
 Sunburned Hand of the Man - Fire Escape (Smalltown Supersound, 2007)
 Steve Reid Ensemble - Daxaar (Domino Records, 2007)
 One Little Plane - Until (Text Records, 2008)
 Foals - Balloons, Cassius, & Tron (alternate versions available as B-Sides) (Transgressive, 2008)
 Sunburned Hand of the Man – A (Ecstatic Peace, 2010)
 One Little Plane – Into the Trees (Text Records, 2012)
 Omar Souleyman - Wenu Wenu (Sublime Frequencies, 2013)
 Neneh Cherry - Blank Project (Smalltown Supersound, 2014)
 Roots Manuva - Facety 2:11 (Big Dada, 2015)
 Jamie xx - Seesaw (Young, 2015)
 Omar Souleyman - Bahdeni Nami (Monkeytown, 2015)
 Katy B - Calm Down (EMI, 2016) (co-produced with Floating Points)
 Neneh Cherry - Broken Politics (Smalltown Supersound, 2018)
Dog Unit - Barking to Gospel (mixed by) (Sonic Deterioration, 2020)

See also
 Fridge

References

External links
 Official discography from the Four Tet website
 

Discographies of British artists
Electronic music discographies